Chapman Island is an island in the Aboriginal Shire of Lockhart River, Queensland, Australia.

Geography 
Chapman Island is part of the Great Barrier Reef Marine Park West of Cape Melville, Queensland and East of Coen between the second three mile opening and Providential Channel of the Barrier Reef about 30 km South East of Lockhart River.

The island is 10 km North East of Old Lochart River and 5 km South East of Cape Direction.

The island covers an area of about 2 hectares.

References

Islands on the Great Barrier Reef
Protected areas of Far North Queensland
Islands of Far North Queensland
Uninhabited islands of Australia
Places in the Great Barrier Reef Marine Park
Aboriginal Shire of Lockhart River